The 1993 Firestone Indy Lights Championship consisted of 12 races and featured the introduction of new Lola chassis. However, this season was also unique in that included a separate "B-Class" classification for drivers using the previous season's March chassis. However, the B class was not a success, never with more than four entries and many oval races only saw a single entry from B-class "champion" Jack Miller, the only driver to compete in all twelve B-Class races.

Bryan Herta put on a strong showing in the main championship, winning 7 races and defeating his closest rival by 91 points.

Calendar

Race summaries

Phoenix race
Held April 4 at Phoenix International Raceway. Bryan Herta won the pole.

Top Five Results
 Sandy Brody
 Bryan Herta
 Robbie Groff
 Jeff Ward
 Greg Moore

B-Class Winner: Jack Miller (only entrant)

Long Beach race
Held April 18 at Long Beach, California Street Course. Franck Fréon won the pole.

Top Five Results
 Steve Robertson
 Franck Fréon
 Bryan Herta
 Pedro Chaves
 Robbie Groff

B-Class Winner: Fredrik Ekblom

Milwaukee race
Held June 6 at The Milwaukee Mile. Steve Robertson won the pole.

Top Five Results
 Bryan Herta
 Nick Firestone
 Robert Amrén
 Buzz Calkins
 Greg Moore

B-Class Winner: Mike Palumbo

Detroit race
Held June 13 at Belle Isle Raceway. Bryan Herta won the pole.

Top Five Results
 Steve Robertson
 Bryan Herta
 Robbie Groff
 Franck Fréon
 James Weaver

B-Class Winner: Bob Reid

Portland race
Held June 27 at Portland International Raceway. Bryan Herta won the pole.

Top Five Results
 Franck Fréon
 Fredrik Ekblom
 Greg Moore
 Bryan Herta
 Bob Dorricott, Jr.

B-Class Winner: Jack Miller (only entrant)

Cleveland race
Held July 11 at Burke Lakefront Airport. Bryan Herta won the pole.

Top Five Results
 Bryan Herta
 Steve Robertson
 Franck Fréon
 Robbie Groff
 Pedro Chaves

B-Class Winner: Bob Reid

Toronto race
Held July 18 at Exhibition Place. Steve Robertson won the pole.

Top Five Results
 Bryan Herta
 Franck Fréon
 Pedro Chaves
 Fredrik Ekblom
 Robbie Groff

B-Class Winner: Bob Reid

Loudon race
Held August 8 at New Hampshire International Speedway. Bryan Herta won the pole.

Top Five Results
 Steve Robertson
 Robbie Groff
 Harald Huysman
 Buzz Calkins
 Fredrik Ekblom

B-Class Winner: Jack Miller (only entrant)

Vancouver race
Held August 29 at Pacific Place. Steve Robertson won the pole.

Top Five Results
 Bryan Herta
 Pedro Chaves
 Eddie Lawson
 Nick Firestone
 Franck Fréon

B-Class Winner: Jack Miller

Mid-Ohio race
Held September 12 at The Mid-Ohio Sports Car Course. Bryan Herta won the pole.

Top Five Results
 Bryan Herta
 Steve Robertson
 Pedro Chaves
 Greg Moore
 Nick Firestone

B-Class Winner: Jack Miller (only entrant)

Nazareth race
Held September 19 at Nazareth Speedway. Bryan Herta won the pole.

Top Five Results
 Bryan Herta
 Nick Firestone
 Franck Fréon
 Robbie Groff
 Fredrik Ekblom

B-Class Winner: Jack Miller (only entrant)

Laguna Seca race
Held October 3 at Mazda Raceway Laguna Seca. Bryan Herta won the pole.

Top Five Results
 Bryan Herta
 Eddie Lawson
 Robbie Groff
 Pedro Chaves
 Fredrik Ekblom

B-Class Winner: David Pook

Final points standings

Driver

Main championship

For every race the points were awarded: 20 points to the winner, 16 for runner-up, 14 for third place, 12 for fourth place, 10 for fifth place, 8 for sixth place, 6 seventh place, winding down to 1 point for 12th place. Additional points were awarded to the pole winner (1 point) and to the driver leading the most laps (1 point).

Note:

Race 13 – no additional point for the pole-position was awarded due to rain, starting grid were determined by championship points standing.

B-Class championship

Note:

Unclear if there were also additional points awarded.

Complete Overview

R13=retired, but classified NS=did not start (9)=place after practice, but grid position not held free

References 

Indy Lights seasons
Indy Lights Season, 1993
Indy Lights